Pieralberto Carrara (born 14 February 1966) is a former Italian biathlete. He grew up in Serina. At the 1998 Olympics he won a silver in the 20 km individual. In the 1992–93 season he ended in third in the overall World Cup standings behind Mikael Löfgren and Mark Kirchner.

Biathlon results
All results are sourced from the International Biathlon Union.

Olympic Games

World Championships

*During Olympic seasons competitions are only held for those events not included in the Olympic program.
**The team event was added in 1989 and subsequently removed in 1998, pursuit having been added in 1997 with mass start being added in 1999.

Individual victories
2 victories (1 In, 1 Sp)

*Results are from UIPMB and IBU races which include the Biathlon World Cup, Biathlon World Championships and the Winter Olympic Games.

Further notable results
 1990: 3rd, Italian championships of biathlon
 1991: 3rd, Italian championships of biathlon, sprint
 1992: 3rd, Italian championships of biathlon, sprint
 1994:
 2nd, Italian championships of biathlon
 3rd, Italian championships of biathlon, sprint
 1995: 1st, Italian championships of biathlon
 1996:
 1st, Italian championships of biathlon
 1st, Italian championships of biathlon, sprint
 1997: 2nd, Italian championships of biathlon, sprint
 1999: 2nd, Italian championships of biathlon, pursuit

References

External links
 
 
 

1966 births
Living people
Sportspeople from Bergamo
Italian male biathletes
Biathletes at the 1988 Winter Olympics
Biathletes at the 1992 Winter Olympics
Biathletes at the 1994 Winter Olympics
Biathletes at the 1998 Winter Olympics
Olympic biathletes of Italy
Medalists at the 1998 Winter Olympics
Olympic medalists in biathlon
Olympic silver medalists for Italy
Biathlon World Championships medalists